Sea nymph may refer to:

 Amphibolis (also "sea nymph"), a genus in the family Cymodoceaceae
 Nereids, female spirits of sea waters in Greek mythology
 Sea Nymph, a 50-foot sailboat abandoned in the Pacific after its crew was rescued by the US Navy
 The Sea Nymphs (album), the self-titled debut studio album by the English psychedelic folk band the Sea Nymphs
 The Sea Nymphs (band), English psychedelic folk band from Kingston upon Thames
 The Sea Nymphs (film), a 1914 American short comedy film
 , an S-class submarine of the third batch built for the Royal Navy during World War II
 Violated Paradise (also Sea Nymphs), a 1963 Italian sexploitation film directed and produced by Marion Gering